The Mosque of the Dome of the Mahdi or Al-Mahdi Mosque is one of the historical mosques in the historic old city of Sana'a, Yemen. It forms a part of UNESCO World Heritage Site Old City of Sana'a. It is located in the Al-Kareem Al-Mahdi neighborhood in the western Sarar district. It was built in 1651 by the order of Imam Mahdi Abbas bin Mansour. The tomb was built after the death of Imam Mahdi Abbas in 1768.

See also
List of mosques in Yemen

References

17th-century mosques
Buildings and structures completed in 1651
Mosques in Sanaa